The Minnesota Vikings are an American football team playing in the National Football League (NFL). The Vikings compete in the NFL as a member club of the league's National Football Conference (NFC) North division. The team was established in 1959, when three Minneapolis businessmen – Bill Boyer, H. P. Skoglund and Max Winter – were awarded a franchise in the new American Football League (AFL). In January 1960, the ownership group forfeited its AFL membership and, along with Bernie Ridder and Ole Haugsrud, was awarded the NFL's 14th franchise, with play to begin in 1961.

Since the franchise's inception, the Vikings have completed 61 seasons of play in the NFL. The team won one NFL Championship in 1969, and was the last team crowned NFL champions before the AFL–NFL merger in 1970. The franchise has been conference champions three times since the merger, but has never won the Super Bowl. The Vikings have been divisional champions 20 times, most among current members of their division. Minnesota has played 820 regular and postseason games and has appeared in the postseason 30 times.

The team's worst season was 1962, when it won two games, lost eleven, and tied one (a .154 winning percentage). Their worst seasons since the NFL changed to a 16-game schedule were in 1984 and 2011, when they could only manage a 3–13 record. The best regular-season record was achieved in 1998, when the Vikings went 15–1, but kicker Gary Anderson, who had gone 35-for-35 in field goal attempts during the regular season, missed a 38-yard attempt with less than three minutes remaining in the NFC Championship Game. With an overtime loss to the Atlanta Falcons, the Vikings became the first 15–1 team in NFL history not to reach the Super Bowl.

Key

Seasons

Footnotes
The Vikings were defeated on a desperation touchdown pass thrown by Cowboys quarterback Roger Staubach with less than a minute left in the game. Staubach coined the phrase "Hail Mary pass", referring to his toss, and the game itself became known as "The Hail Mary".
The NFL expanded from a 14-game regular season schedule to 16 beginning in 1978.
The 1982 NFL season was shortened from 16 regular season games to 9 due to a players' strike. For playoff seedings, division standings were ignored and the league used a 16-team tournament format for the season.
The 1987 NFL season was shortened from 16 regular season games to 15 due to a players' strike.
The "finish", "wins", "losses", and "ties" columns list regular season results and exclude any postseason play. Regular and postseason records are combined only at the bottom of the list.

References
General
 
 

Inline citations

Minnesota Vikings
 
Seasons